Sar Asiab-e Yusefi Rural District is a rural district (dehestan) in Bahmai-ye Garmsiri District, Bahmai County, Kohgiluyeh and Boyer-Ahmad Province, Iran. At the 2006 census, its population was 5,145, in 1,021 families. The rural district has 39 villages.

References 

Rural Districts of Kohgiluyeh and Boyer-Ahmad Province
Bahmai County